The Piréz people (Hungarian: Pirézek) are a fictional nation invented by Tárki, a Hungarian polling company, to measure attitudes regarding immigration.

The Piréz 
In 2006 the Tárki Institute conducted a survey to assess Hungarian attitudes toward foreigners, asking if immigration should be controlled strictly. Some of the questions concerned the fictitious Piréz people. The survey revealed that, according to 61% of those who answered the questionnaire, immigration to Hungary should be controlled, and 59% opposed the immigration of the fictional Piréz.

The results of the survey, including the fact that "Piréz" people are fictitious, were widely reported in the Hungarian media.

The majority (61%) would consider allowing or disallowing immigration depending on a migrant's national origin (other respondents' views, whether in support of or opposed to immigration, took no account of migrants' origins). Those who thought distinctions on the grounds of origin should be made were highly dismissive of Arabs, 87% saying their migration should be restricted. 81% of them thought Chinese immigration should be controlled, and 68% disfavoured the immigration of the non-existing Piréz.

Later allusions
On January 29, 2018, Zoom.hu published the results of a poll created by Policy Agenda, where potential voters were asked whether they believe the "Party of George Soros" has the potential of winning the 2018 elections in Hungary - no such party exists or ever existed, yet only 24% of the answers indicated that they knew of this. The article, alluding to the Hungarian government's long-running campaign against Soros, noted that "Soros is the new Piréz".

References 

Polling
Prejudices
Immigration to Hungary